Fausto Caffarelli (died 1566) was a Roman Catholic prelate who served as Bishop of Fondi (1555–1566).

Biography
On 17 July 1555, Fausto Caffarelli was appointed during the papacy of Pope Paul IV as Bishop of Fondi.
He served as Bishop of Fondi until his death in 1537.

References 

16th-century Italian Roman Catholic bishops
Bishops appointed by Pope Paul IV
1566 deaths